Veterans Memorial Stadium is a multipurpose outdoor stadium in Quincy, Massachusetts. Built from 1937-1938 under the Works Progress Administration, it seats 5,000 spectators for football, soccer, Rugby union and lacrosse. The stadium underwent a $1.2 million renovation in 2006, including accessibility improvements and new synthetic turf as well as making the stadium usable as a lacrosse, rugby and soccer field, and another $1.5 million renovation in 2018, adding extra capacity and a large electronic video board. It is the home field of Quincy High School athletics, namely football and soccer, and the New England Free Jacks of Major League Rugby. The grounds have most notably held the annual intracity Thanksgiving Day Game between QHS and NQHS, dubbed by SI.com as one of the best in America, since 1932.    

The land the stadium sits on is part of Merrymount Park, which’s was gifted to the city by the Adams family. The current stadium replaced a prior athletic field that was known as Pfaffman’s Oval, a cinder dirt track with a large embankment on one side, which made for a natural amphitheater for spectators. After several attempts to fund the stadium failed, ground was broken in January, 1937. The stadium was opened on September 25, 1938 in a ceremony attended by Senator Henry Cabot Lodge.  

Throughout the 1960s, the Boston Patriots played several preseason intra-squad scrimmages for charity at the stadium.   

In 1976 it served as a home stadium for the Boston Minutemen of the North American Soccer League.

The stadium served as the home of the Boston Cannons of Major League Lacrosse for the 2019 season.  Due to Covid, the team played the entire shortened 2020 season behind closed doors at Navy–Marine Corps Memorial Stadium in Annapolis, Maryland, in which they would win the championship. The team was then absorbed by the barnstorming Premier Lacrosse League, for which a home stadium was no longer necessary.  

On June 28, 2021, the New England Free Jacks of Major League Rugby announced they were moving into the stadium starting with the final game of the 2021 MLR season.

References

1938 establishments in Massachusetts
Veterans Memorial Stadium (Quincy)
Boston Cannons venues
Buildings and structures in Quincy, Massachusetts
Lacrosse venues in Massachusetts
Major League Lacrosse venues
Major League Rugby stadiums
New England Free Jacks
North American Soccer League (1968–1984) stadiums
Rugby union stadiums in the United States
Sports venues completed in 1938
Veterans Memorial Stadium (Quincy)
Sports in Norfolk County, Massachusetts